Cydia montana is a moth of the family Tortricidae. It was first described by Lord Walsingham in 1907. It is endemic to the island of Hawaii.

The larvae feed on Acacia koa.

External links

Species info

Grapholitini
Endemic moths of Hawaii